Savers, Inc. headquartered in Bellevue, Washington, U.S., is a privately held for-profit thrift store retailer offering second hand merchandise. An international company, Savers has more than 315 locations throughout the United States of America, Canada, and Australia, and receives its merchandise by paying money to non-profit organizations for donated clothing and household items. Savers is known as Value Village in the Pacific Northwest, the Baltimore metropolitan area, and most of Canada, and Village des Valeurs in Quebec. Chicago stores and some locations in the Washington, DC metropolitan area are under the name Unique. In Australia and other regions of the U.S., the stores share the corporation's name.

Business operations
Savers' business model involves partnership with local non-profits and purchasing and reselling donated items. The non-profits collect and deliver donated goods to Savers, which pays them for the items at a bulk rate regardless of whether they ever make it to the sales floor. As of 2011, the company had paid $1.1 billion to approximately 130 nonprofit partners, and as of 2012, had 315 stores worldwide and reached $1 billion in revenue.

Items deemed resellable are displayed for purchase in stores. Savers also has a recycling program and attempts to recycle any reusable items that cannot be sold at the stores, as well as any items that do not sell over a period of time to make room for fresh merchandise. Savers has buyers for its recyclables throughout the world and attempts to keep as much donated product out of the waste stream as possible. 
In Minnesota, Savers pays non-profit partners $0.053 per pound of clothing, $0.035 per pound of homewares, $0.02 per pound of books and $0.02 per pound of large items (e.g. furniture). By the end of 2018, the company had discontinued the use of plastic bags in its stores.

According to Diabetes Canada, it has had a reusable goods donation program with Value Village where donations of clothing and small household items generate $5,000,000 CAD annually to support diabetes research.

Ownership history 
The company was founded in 1954 in San Francisco, California.

Berkshire Partners bought a 50% stake in the company in 2000. Freeman Spogli & Co. became the majority owner in 2006. Leonard Green & Partners and TPG Capital bought out Freeman's shares in 2012.

In March 2019, Savers reached a restructuring agreement to hand ownership of the company over to private equity firms Ares Management and Crescent Capital Group.

Controversy
In May 2015, the Minnesota Attorney General filed suit claiming that Savers was misleading the public, paying only a very small percentage to the non-profit charities which partner with the company. Savers settled in June 2015, increasing transparency and paying $300,000 to each of its partner charities in Minnesota to compensate for fundraising disruptions. In the same year, the Attorney General filed suit against the Epilepsy Foundation for failing to monitor Savers for compliance with their partnership contract. Money raised through their partnership with Savers accounted for 38-50% of the Epilepsy Foundation’s revenue

In November 2019 King County Superior Court Judge Roger Rogoff ruled that the corporation had misled the public into believing the organization was a charity, but the ruling was overturned in August 2021 by a Washington state appeals court.

Safety concerns

In December 2018, a family in Pitt Meadows, British Columbia, Canada reported their six-year-old son found a hypodermic needle and two partially-used tubes of glue in a used Mouse Trap board game they had bought from a Value Village in Coquitlam, British Columbia.

In October 2019, a man reported getting a needlestick injury when he tried on a boot at a Value Village (in New Westminster, British Columbia, Canada) and was told he would need blood tests including for HIV and hepatitis.

References

External links

Savers US Website
Savers Australia Website
Value Village's Website
Village des Valeurs's Website
Value Village Listens Website

Multinational companies
American companies established in 1954
Retail companies established in 1954
Retail companies of the United States
Companies based in Bellevue, Washington
1954 establishments in Washington (state)